Atractus esepe, the indistinct ground snake, is a species of snake in the family Colubridae. The species can be found in Ecuador. It is oviparous.

References 

Atractus
Reptiles of Ecuador
Endemic fauna of Ecuador
Reptiles described in 2017